Service governance is a means of achieving good corporate governance through managing internal corporate services across and throughout an enterprise. It engages stakeholders and delivery channels for the purpose of effectively managing risk, as well as driving the intended business value with a focus on how decisions are made and enforced in a dynamic business environment.

Though its initial focus was on IT services, this approach to management can apply to accounting, business administration, and other internal service sectors. Institutionalizing these services enables the monitoring and control of risk, value, and cost. Principal among the issues is the fair funding for each service and the allocation system for scarce services.

Institutionalizing internal corporate services is the corporate management equivalent of a massive  general ledger, only with the line items reflecting the services, not simply departments. The service portfolio allows the governance of services as a means to govern the organization by value.

Service portfolio 
The portfolio of services is a list of all internal services that are available within the organization. The portfolio describes each service, how it is funded, its associated costs and ownership boundaries, and its current performance and identified conflicts. The portfolio will include services which have been outsourced and are supplied to the organization by third parties.

The services portfolio provides a map of the organization, providing directors with a different way of understanding the dynamics of the organization than those received from financial reports. This allows the board to more easily make decisions based on accurate and contemporaneous information.

Value 
Service governance uses the methods described in the management of value (MoV) to discover the requirements of the organization and to use those on design services, and their measures to deliver those values. In particular, the service governance organization is chartered to define clear service ownership boundaries and specify a fair funding model.

Measurement and compliance 
Well-established practices are used to design measures and metrics for the organization and to meet the requirements of the corporate mission, charter, and policy. This ensures that metrics inform what is required by the organization and supply accurate information: to the board for strategic governance decisions and to management for operational decisions.

Accurate metrics also ensure compliance with the requirements of audit, enable the production of financial and sustainability reports, and reports on corporate citizenship.

Enterprise service management 
A component of service governance, enterprise service management (ESM) is a means of extending service management across an entire organization, often from IT service management (ITSM).

ESM provides an integrated view of core service business processes, often in real-time, using common databases. ESM systems track: business resources, including people, parts and assets; and the status of customer commitments, such as service requests, orders, repairs and service-level agreements (SLAs). The applications that comprise the system share data across various departments (customer service, technical support, sales, field service, etc.), which then use the information for their work. ESM facilitates information flow between departments and coordinates activities with external resources involved in the service business process.

Enterprise service management is also a term used to generically describe the use of service processes and technologies across an organization. The term is broad in comparison to ITSM, which only concerns the management of IT services.

History 
The term service governance has been used to describe the success that a number of organizations have had in using the 'best practice' advice found in frameworks such as ITIL, The Open Group Architecture Framework (TOGAF), and others, for company-wide service design and operation.

Many of the ideas of service governance, including the important one of sustainability, are included in ISO 37000, published in September 2021 ISO 37000

References

External links
 WorldBank/IFC Corporate Governance Portal
 World Bank Corporate Governance Reports

Corporate governance
Corporate governance in the United Kingdom
Economy of South Africa
Information technology governance
IT service management